Mbombela Local Municipality is an administrative area in the Ehlanzeni District of Mpumalanga in South Africa. Mbombela is a siSwati name meaning "a lot of people in a small space".

Merger with Umjindi
At the time of the 2016 municipal elections, Umjindi Local Municipality was disestablished and merged into the Mbombela Local Municipality. So, the town of Barberton is now part of the Mbombela Local Municipality.

Main places
The 2001 census divided the municipality into the following main places:

Politics 

The municipal council consists of ninety members elected by mixed-member proportional representation. Forty-five councillors are elected by first-past-the-post voting in forty-five wards, while the remaining forty-five are chosen from party lists so that the total number of party representatives is proportional to the number of votes received. In the election of 1 November 2021 the African National Congress (ANC) won a majority of fifty-nine seats on the council.

The following table shows the results of the election.

References

External links
Mbombela Government site

2000 establishments in South Africa
Local municipalities of the Ehlanzeni District Municipality